Aline Gouget Morin (born 1977) is a French mathematician and cryptographer whose works include contributions to the design of the SOSEMANUK stream cipher and Shabal hash algorithm, and methods for anonymized digital currency. She is a researcher for Gemalto, an international digital security company.

Education
Gouget completed a PhD in 2004 at the University of Caen Normandy. Her dissertation, Etude de propriétés cryptographiques des fonctions booléennes et algorithme de confusion pour le chiffrement symétrique, was advised by Claude Carlet.

Recognition
In 2017, Gouget was the winner of the Irène Joliot-Curie Prize in the category for women in business and technology.

References

External links
Home page

1977 births
Living people
French cryptographers
21st-century French mathematicians
French women mathematicians
Modern cryptographers
21st-century women mathematicians
Women cryptographers
21st-century French women